Troglohyphantes gracilis, one of several species to be occasionally called Kočevje subterranean spider, is a species of spider in the family Linyphiidae. It is endemic to Slovenia.

References

Linyphiidae
Spiders of Europe
Endemic fauna of Slovenia
Taxonomy articles created by Polbot
Spiders described in 1919